La violenza dei dannati is a 1965 Italian film directed by Giovanni Roccardi.

Cast
Fernando Andreoli
Jake LaMotta
Roberto Parisini
Teresa Pellati
Frank Petrella
Enrico Salvatore
Renato Tassi

External links
 

1965 films
Italian drama films
1960s Italian-language films
1960s Italian films